Lemanea fluviatilis is a species of alga belonging to the family Lemaneaceae.

It is native to Europe and Northern America.

References

Batrachospermales